Maurice William Allingham (19 August 1896 – 15 September 1993) was an Australian rules footballer from South Australia. He was the Port Adelaide Football Club's leading goal kicker on four occasions and won the club's best and fairest in 1931. He enlisted for duty during World War I on 16 February 1917 and was part of the 5th Machine Gun Battalion. He returned to Australia on 5 July 1919 and was awarded the British War Medal and Victory Medal for his duties.

References

External links

Australian rules footballers from South Australia
Port Adelaide Football Club (SANFL) players
Port Adelaide Football Club players (all competitions)
1993 deaths
1896 births
Australian military personnel of World War I